Cavern Flooring is a supplement for fantasy role-playing games published by Sacred Band Publications.

Contents
Cavern Floorings is a package of twelve A4 sheets of thin card, which resemble a plan view of a subterranean area.

Reception
Doug Cowie reviewed Cavern Flooring for Imagine magazine, and stated that "The designers have shown a constructive approach when faced with my criticisms. They tell me that the thin card is deliberate because the flexibility of the system necessitates the overlapping of pieces, which would not be feasible with thick card."

References

Fantasy role-playing game supplements
Role-playing game mapping aids